Secret Mission is a 1942 British war film directed by Harold French and starring Hugh Williams, James Mason, Nancy Price, Carla Lehmann and Roland Culver.

Plot
During the Second World War, British Army Major Peter Garnett assembles a team consisting of Captain ‘Red’ Gowan; Private ‘Nobby’ Clark, and Raoul de Carnot, a member of the Free French forces. A small boat takes them across the Channel, through the minefield near to the coast of occupied France. Sub-Lieutenant Jackson (Stewart Granger)  watches their dinghy pull away and remarks that he does not envy them their jobs, which are to collect intelligence on German military strength in the area, prior to an air raid.

Ashore, Gowan kills a sentry.  They set a time and place for a rendezvous in two days, and the code for bringing the aircraft. They split up, Gowan and Nobby to the village, Raoul and Garnett to the chateau that is Raoul's ancestral home.

Nobby knows the area well: He used to live in Saint Antoine, where he ran a café with his French wife, Lulu. She welcomes him home with open arms, and her exhausting demands on his time provide some ongoing comic relief.

Raoul and Garnett are welcomed, more or less, by Raoul's sister Michele. Their brother is a prisoner. She wants Raoul to stay and help to manage the land. She is resigned to cooperating with the occupiers, and is too frightened to assist in the mission.

They contact a local businessman, M. Fayolle, now hated by most of the townspeople for his open collaboration with the occupying forces, but in fact secretly working with the French Resistance. He and his daughter Estelle have helped 100 Allied servicemen to escape. He provides them with special papers.

At German headquarters, Garnett and Gowan masquerade as champagne salesmen, aided by a personal letter from von Ribbentrop and champagne supplied by Nobby. Having thus established their bona fides, they do deals with German officers for supplying their messes. They are able to photograph a map showing troop disposition, and also extract a great deal of information from the unwary Nazis, who suspect them of being either Gestapo or counter espionage. Annoyed, General von Reichman puts in a call to Berlin.

The agents locate a secret aerodrome, built into a cliffside so that it cannot be bombed. A patrol hears them in the woods, fires into the trees, and Raoul is shot. He dies at home, with Michele and the priest beside him. Angry and heartbroken, Michele tells them to leave,

Raoul died without showing them the important rendezvous point, an ancient tree where he and Michele played as children. They must return to ask Michele where it is. She refuses to help. M. Fayolle and his daughter, Estelle, arrive to speak to Raoul, revealing their role in the Resistance to Michele, risking their lives. They are distressed to learn of Raoul's death; they are here to warn the others that the woods will be heavily patrolled. Reichman has learned that von Ribbentrop never heard of them and has launched a manhunt. Michele goes to warn them and show them the tree, but a patrol captures them. At the tree, Private Clark shows up in the armored propaganda truck (nicknamed the “Music Box”) which he has just hijacked. Garnett and Clark  change into Nazi uniforms and head to Nazi headquarters, where he gives the Medical Officer (Herbert Lom) instructions to release a prisoner, Captain MacKenzie, to them. He does so, but becomes suspicious.

At 10 past three a.m., at first light,  they signal a squadron of planes carrying paratroopers, who land and overrun the factory and blow it up.

They all rendezvous at the beach. Michele and Garnett have fallen in love. As the others embark by boat to return to England, Michele refuses his offer to take her with them and promises to start working with the Resistance. She gives him the little cross she wears around her neck and they kiss. “Goodbye Michele.”  “Au revoir, Peter.” She turns and walks away, slowly at first, then with confidence and purpose.

Cast
 Hugh Williams as Major Peter Garnett 
 James Mason as Raoul de Carnot
 Carla Lehmann as Michele de Carnot 
 Roland Culver as Captain 'Red' Gowan 
 Michael Wilding as Private 'Nobby' Clark 
 Nancy Price as Violette, housekeeper 
 Karel Stepanek as Major Lang 
 Fritz Wendhausen as General von Reichman (as F.R. Wendhausen) 
 Betty Warren as Lulu Clark 
 Percy Walsh as M. Fayolle 
 Anita Gombault as Estelle Fayolle
 Nicholas Stuart as Captain Mackenzie 
 John Salew as Hauptmann Gruening 
 Yvonne Andre as Martine, money collector 
 David Page as Rene de Carnot, boy 
 Brefni O'Rorke as Village Priest 
 Beatrice Varley as British Cook 
 Stewart Granger as Sub-Lieutenant Jackson 
 Oscar Ebelsbacher as Provost Officer 
 Herbert Lom as Medical Officer

Critical reception
Leonard Maltin described it as a "Stiff-upper-lip WW2 drama" that is "Well paced dramatically," but whose "comical touches seem awkwardly out of place"; while the Radio Times noted, "There's a modicum of excitement" in the efforts of the various characters "to glean information about Nazi invasion plans. But the comic subplot involving Wilding and his French wife, and the romance that develops between Williams and Mason's sister (Carla Lehmann), are embarrassingly twee. Credit to director Harold French for keeping the pace brisk, but this is unremarkable fare"; and 20/20 Movie Reviews wrote, "the writers of the 1980s British comedy show Allo Allo must have seen Secret Mission at some point because the similarities are just too numerous to be coincidental. The only difference is that Secret Mission is straight while Allo Allo is a broad farce. Probably the only comical aspect of the movie is James Mason’s French accent, but he does at least look suitably embarrassed as he substitutes ‘z’s for ‘th’s."

References

External links

1942 films
1940s war drama films
Films about the French Resistance
1940s English-language films
World War II films made in wartime
Films directed by Harold French
British war drama films
Films with screenplays by Anatole de Grunwald
British black-and-white films
1942 drama films
1940s British films